Kent Beyda (born October 11, 1953) is an American film editor.

Life and career
Beyda worked as an assistant editor on John Cassavetes' Opening Night (1977), Allan Arkush's Rock 'n' Roll High School (1979), and Joe Dante's The Howling (1981). He then moved into editing on the Julie Corman-produced Saturday the 14th (1981). On that film Beyda met his wife Nancy who was at that time working as Corman's assistant. He went on to do a series of music videos for Rod Stewart, Elvis Costello, Dokken, Bette Midler and Mick Jagger, Aldo Nova, Barbra Streisand, and Arkush's follow-up to Rock 'n' Roll High School called Get Crazy (1983). He then edited the mockumentary This Is Spinal Tap (1984).

Beyda's first film for a major studio was Fright Night (1985), a horror comedy for Columbia Pictures. Next he edited Out of Bounds (1986), directed by Richard Tuggle for Columbia. Beyda went on to edit Innerspace (1987) produced by Steven Spielberg and directed by Joe Dante, X: The Unheard Music (1986), a documentary about the Los Angeles punk group X, Alien Nation (1988), Fear (1990) starring Ally Sheedy, Spielberg and Dante's Gremlins 2: The New Batch (1990), True Identity (1991), Billy Crystal's directorial debut Mr. Saturday Night (1992),  Spielberg and Brian Levant's The Flintstones (1994), Crystal's Forget Paris (1995), Jingle All the Way (1996) with Arnold Schwarzenegger, The Out-of-Towners (1999) with Steve Martin and Goldie Hawn, The Flintstones in Viva Rock Vegas (2000), Big Momma's House (2000), Scooby-Doo (2002), Scooby-Doo 2: Monsters Unleashed (2004), S. Darko (2009), Jonah Hex (2010), Yogi Bear (2010), and Parental Guidance (2012).

As a consultant, Beyda has participated in the films George of the Jungle (1997), Dude, Where's My Car? (2000), Robots (2005), Idiocracy (2006), Fantastic Four (2005), Horton Hears a Who! (2008), and  Despicable Me (2010). He has worked on location in New York, Paris, San Francisco, Atlanta, Vancouver, Australia, and New Zealand. He is a member of American Cinema Editors and the Academy of Motion Picture Arts and Sciences.

In September 2009, Beyda took part in "Editing for Animation", the second part of the Academy's Perspectives in Editing series. The event featured a panel of five current leading animation editors, Beyda, John Carnochan, Kevin Nolting, Nancy Frazen, and Lois Freeman-Fox.

Filmography

References

External links

American film editors
American Cinema Editors
Living people
1953 births